Henry Granville Fitzalan-Howard, 14th Duke of Norfolk, (7 November 181525 November 1860) was a British peer and politician. He was hereditary Earl Marshal and the last undisputed Chief Butler of England.

Family
He was the son of Henry Charles Howard, 13th Duke of Norfolk, and Lady Charlotte Sophia Leveson-Gower.

He married Augusta Lyons (1821–1886), of the Lyons family, on 19 June 1839. She was the daughter of Sir Edmund Lyons (later 1st Baron Lyons) and Augusta Louisa Rogers, and was often known by her middle name, "Minna". The Duke had eleven children by Augusta. The Duke and Duchess are both buried in the mausoleum in Fitzalan Chapel on the western grounds of Arundel Castle.

Public life
Howard was returned as a Whig for Arundel in the British House of Commons from 1837 to 1851, and for Limerick City from 1851 to 1852. He was a devoted Roman Catholic, and resigned from his Arundel seat rather than support the Ecclesiastical Titles Act 1851, but secured the Limerick seat when its incumbent resigned in his favour. He edited the Lives of Philip Howard, earl of Arundel, and of Anne Dacres, his wife (1857 and 1861). He raised the 9th (Arundel) Sussex Rifle Volunteer Corps on 28 February 1860 and commanded it as Captain.

Private life 
The Norfolk Royale Hotel in Bournemouth was originally built as a villa for the duke.

Family

Issue

Family tree

References

External links 
 

1815 births
1860 deaths
314
32
306
Earls of Norfolk (1644 creation)
22
English Roman Catholics
Earls Marshal
Henry Fitzalan-Howard, 14th Duke of Norfolk
Fitzalan-Howard, Henry Granville
Fitzalan-Howard, Henry Granville
Fitzalan-Howard, Henry Granville
Fitzalan-Howard, Henry Granville
Fitzalan-Howard, Henry Granville
Norfolk, D14
Henry